Meeting for Sufferings is an executive committee of Britain Yearly Meeting, the body which acts on behalf of members of the Religious Society of Friends (Quakers) in Great Britain and the Crown Dependencies. It has about 200 members who meet five times a year to make decisions when the Yearly Meeting is not in session.

History 

Meeting for Sufferings was originally established to assess the persecution of Friends and attempt to obtain redress. Morning Meeting, a now-obsolete body of London Quakers, agreed in October 1675 to commission certain local Friends to meet four times a year for this purpose. Their efforts were mainly directed towards the suffering of imprisoned Quakers, but they also lobbied Parliament to reduce the burden of tithes and oaths. (The refusal of Friends to take oaths, based on Jesus Christ's words "Swear not at all" (Matthew 5:33 – 37), caused great difficulties with the government and courts.) Smaller weekly meetings, which continued until 1798, helped to push this process forward.

In the eighteenth century, the Meeting began to broaden its interests, campaigning against the slave trade; a Slave Trade Committee between 1783 and 1792 helped prepare the way for the Slave Trade Act 1807. Other legislative successes included the Affirmation Acts, which allowed Quakers to avoid oath-taking; however, attempts to put forward a "Quakers Tithes Bill" were fruitless.

The beginning of the nineteenth century saw a renewed interest in contact with other Quaker groups around the world, especially in continental Europe, Calcutta, and southern Africa. Even so, Meeting for Sufferings remained a London-based body until the expansion of the railways allowed Quakers from more remote parts of the country to participate. The larger membership meant that even more subcommittees could form, covering administration, libraries, and printing; and lobbying against gambling, opium and war.

It was not until 1898 that women were allowed to join the Meeting. Although the Society of Friends was egalitarian in many other respects, the participation of women in meetings for business - as opposed to meetings for worship - had been contentious since its beginning. Founder George Fox's model was a middle way between exclusion and total inclusion: men and women were to have separate meetings for business, communicating by the passing of messages. The perceived benefit of this system was that it made it easier for wives to have different opinions from their husbands. When as in London the male membership was unusually wealthy and powerful, female interests often went unheard. (All meetings now have mixed membership.)

During the twentieth century, Meeting for Sufferings absorbed various other powerful bodies, including the old Morning Meeting in 1901. It came under the direct authority of the Yearly Meeting as part of a process of normalisation of Quaker institutions. The subcommittees of the two Meetings merged, and in 1965 Meeting for Sufferings was given the role of appointing their members. In return, it had to become more representative, drawing its membership directly from the monthly meetings (the basic unit of Quaker organisation) rather than quarterly meetings (larger assemblies of several monthly meetings).

Meeting for Sufferings is subordinate to Yearly Meeting, which ratifies its minutes and has overall constitutional authority.

Structure 

Most members are appointed by Yearly Meeting, based on nominations put forward by each monthly meeting or by Meeting for Suffering's own standing committees. It may also co-opt a few members on its own initiative. Members normally serve a three-year term - the next round of appointments is in 2006. The table below shows the role of the relevant committees that provide members, as of 1999.

Various officers of Yearly Meeting, and staff employed by Meeting for Sufferings, also attend.

Meeting for Sufferings Committee 

A special subcommittee recommends policies and budgets for the main Meeting, including the Yearly Meeting budget. It also carries out oversight of Meeting for Sufferings on behalf of Yearly Meeting.

It has twelve members, all drawn from Meeting for Sufferings; each year, four are replaced. No member may serve for more than two terms (six years).

Current changes 
Britain Yearly Meeting is implementing a number of constitutional changes. Among these is the appointment of a small body of Trustees, who took over some of the functions of Meeting for Sufferings in January 2007.

References 

 Quaker Faith and Practice, Yearly Meeting of the Religious Society of Friends (Quakers) in Britain. ( [1999 revision]).
 Meeting for Sufferings web page.

Quaker organisations based in the United Kingdom
Religious organizations established in the 1670s
Quaker organizations established in the 17th century